Pablo Albano and Lucas Arnold Ker were the defending champions, but Albano chose to compete at Cincinnati at the same week. Arnold Ker teamed up with Tom Vanhoudt and lost in the first round to Wayne Arthurs and Richard Fromberg.

Cristian Brandi and Filippo Messori won the title by defeating Brandon Coupe and David Roditi 7–5, 6–4 in the final.

Seeds

Draw

Draw

References

External links
 Official results archive (ATP)
 Official results archive (ITF)

San Marino CEPU Open
1997 ATP Tour